Kusonje is a village in Croatia in the town of Pakrac, Požega-Slavonia County. It is connected by the D38 highway. Kusonje was the site of an ambush during the Croatian War of Independence in 1991, when 20 Croatian policemen and soldiers were killed by Serb rebels.

Demographics
According to the 2011 population census, the village of Kusonje had 308 inhabitants. 
This represents 27.97% of its pre-war population according to the 1991 census.

Population by ethnicity:

History 
Kusonje was part of Croatian medieval state. In 1543, Kusonje and the nearby town of Pakrac were conquered by the Ottoman Empire. The Ottoman rule lasted until it was seized and reconquered by the Austrians in 1691.
Village had Serbian ethnic majority.  
On August 13, 1942, the croat Ustashe took the Serbian inhabitants of this village to the village church.
After they pushed them inside, they locked the church from the outside, and then set it on fire. In that way, 473 Serbs died. Those who did not stop at the church were slaughtered and thrown into nearby wells.

In 1991, war broke out in Croatia, of which Kusonje and Pakrac were a part. The Yugoslav People's Army captured the town in March 1991, but it was soon retaken by Croatian forces.

See also
Battle of Kusonje

References

Populated places in Požega-Slavonia County
Serb communities in Croatia